Sule Stack or Stack Skerry is an extremely remote island or stack in the North Atlantic off the north coast of Scotland. It is formed of Lewisian gneiss.

Sule Stack and Sule Skerry are home to thousands of gannets and as a result are listed as a special protection area; the island falls within the administrative region of the Orkney Islands.

Bird species nesting on the stack include:
Razorbill Alca torda  	    	    	    	  
Atlantic puffin Fratercula arctica 	  	  	  	 
Fulmar Fulmarus glacialis
Great black-backed gull Larus marinus
Common shag  Phalacrocorax aristotelis
Black-legged kittiwake Rissa tridactyla	  	  	  	 
Arctic tern Sterna paradisaea  	  	  	 
Northern gannet Morus bassanus		  	  	  	 
Common guillemot Uria aalge

See also
 List of outlying islands of Scotland

References

Sources

External links

Special Protection Areas in Scotland
Sites of Special Scientific Interest in Orkney
Stacks of Scotland
Uninhabited islands of Orkney